Pencak silat at the 2015 Southeast Asian Games was held at the Singapore Expo Hall 2, Singapore from 10 to 14 June 2015.

Participating nations
A total of 107 athletes from nine nations will be competing in pencak silat at the 2015 Southeast Asian Games:

Medalists

Seni

Tanding

Men

Women

Medal table

References

External links
  

2015 Southeast Asian Games events
2015